Caroline Frånberg  (born 27 February 1988) is a Swedish football defender who currently plays for Djurgårdens IF. She has played Damallsvenskan football for Djurgårdens IF.

References

Swedish women's footballers
Djurgårdens IF Fotboll (women) players
Damallsvenskan players
1988 births
Place of birth missing (living people)
Living people
Women's association football defenders